Kněževes is a municipality and village in Blansko District in the South Moravian Region of the Czech Republic. It has about 200 inhabitants. The village of Veselka within the municipality is well preserved and is protected by law as a village monument zone.

Administrative parts
Villages of Jobova Lhota and Veselka are administrative parts of Kněževes.

References

Villages in Blansko District